NTPC Anta is a natural gas-fired power station located in Baran district in the Indian state of Rajasthan. It is one of the power plants of NTPC. The gas for it is sourced from GAIL HBJ Pipeline - South Basin Gas field, and its source of water is the Right Canal of Chambal River.

Capacity

References

 NTPC Anta

Natural gas-fired power stations in Delhi
Baran district
Energy infrastructure completed in 1989
1989 establishments in Rajasthan
20th-century architecture in India